, also known as , is a semi-monthly Japanese  manga magazine published by Hakusensha on the 5th and 20th of every month. Hana to Yume was ranked 4th by Japanese girls as their favourite manga anthology in a survey conducted by Oricon in 2006.

Hana to Yume also has several other magazines under its name, such as The Hana to Yume, Bessatsu Hana to Yume, Shōnen Hana to Yume, and Trifle by Hana to Yume.

About
Any series which are serialized in Hana to Yume will be collected into  under the imprint, . While series from related magazines like Bessatsu Hana to Yume, LaLa, LaLa DX, and Melody are also published under the same imprint, certain series from Melody are published under a different imprint, .

The readers have been 95% female. Its demographic consists of 4% of readers under 13, 62.2% for 13–18 years old, 18.6% for 19–23 years old, and those who are 24 and older comprising the remaining 15.2%.

History
Hana to Yume began its publication as a monthly magazine in May 1974, with Kazuko Koyeno's illustration as the cover, with the price of 200 yen. However, in January 1975, its publication was changed from a monthly to a semi-monthly published magazine. The recent price has been 370 yen.

In 1976, two years after Hana to Yume was first published, LaLa (previously known as Hana to Yume LaLa) was created as a sister magazine to Hana to Yume. It later became its own independent magazine with a sister magazine of its own, LaLa DX.

In 2009, the magazine celebrated its 35th anniversary and collaborated with Yahoo! Japan Comic, which digitally distributes the magazine's serialized manga. Glass Mask by Suzue Miuchi and Hanazakari no Kimitachi e by Hisaya Nakajō are among the 235 titles available to be read online. To commemorate the magazine's anniversary, there was an internet radio broadcast streaming at Yahoo! Japan for an hour and a half. Suzue Miuchi was the guest in the second episode of the radio show, broadcast on May 4, 2009.

In 2020, it was announced that various issues will be delayed or combined due to the COVID-19 pandemic.

Hana to Yume Guide Book

The book contains summaries of titles serialized in the magazine since its inception to April 2009. It also has well-wishing messages from 22 manga artists, among of them are Noriko Sasaki, Natsuki Takaya, Marimo Ragawa, Saki Hiwatari, Suzue Miuchi, Hisaya Nakajo, and Nanpei Yamada who have been serializing their work in the magazine. There is also a special quiz and section containing a history of the magazine together with a chronology of domestic topics since the publication of their magazine.

Circulation numbers
In 2004, Hana to Yume had a circulation of 300,416 copies. In the following year, sales figures dropped to 295,208. In 2006, the sales of Hana to Yume were higher at 289,375 copies, while its competitor, Sho-Comi, had only 260,218 copies. As in 2009, sales declined to 226,542 copies.

Serializations

Current

Descendants of Darkness (1996–present)
Skip Beat! (2002–present)
Yona of the Dawn (2009–present)
Colette wa Shinu Koto ni Shita (2013–present)
Dansui! (2013–present)
Tsuiraku JK to Haijin Kyōshi (2017–present)
Koi ni Mudaguchi (2019–present)
Oni no Hanayome wa Taberaretai (2020–present)
It Takes More than a Pretty Face to Fall in Love (2020–present)
Tamon's B-Side (2021–present)
Cinderella no Giri Ane ni Tenseishita Kedo Futari no Ōji ni Dekiaisarete Imasu (2023–present)

Hiatus

Berry Berry (2009–2010)
Liselotte & Witch's Forest (2011–2013)

Past

1974–1979

 Arabesque (1974–1975)
 Natsu e no Tobira (1975)
 Sukeban Deka (1975–1982)
 Glass Mask (1976–1997)
 Patalliro! (1978–1990)

1980–1989

 Please Save My Earth (1986–1994)
 Warau Michael (1987–1988)
 Here Is Greenwood (1987–1991)
Dōbutsu no Oisha-san (1988–1993)

1990–1999

 Earl Cain (1991–1994)
 Baby & Me (1991–1997)
 Songs to Make You Smile (1993–1998)
 Phantom Dream (1994–1997)
 Angel Sanctuary (1994–2000)
 Tower of the Future (1994–1998)
 Yumemiru Happa (1995)
 New York New York (1995–1998)
 Tsubasa: Those with Wings (1995–1998)
 Hana-Kimi (1996–2004)
 Tokyo Crazy Paradise (1996–2002)
 W Juliet (1997–2002)
 Fruits Basket (1998–2006)
 Ludwig Kakumei (1999–2006)
 Never Give Up! (1999–2007)
 Satisfaction Guaranteed (1999–2002)

2000–2009

 Portrait of M & N (2000–2003)
 Global Garden (2001–2004)
 Soul Rescue (2001–2002)
 Tears of a Lamb (2001–2003)
 Blood Hound (2003–2005)
 S.A (2003–2009)
 Gakuen Alice (2003–2013)
 Nosatsu Junkie (2003–2008)
 Wild Ones (2004–2009)
 Mugen Spiral (2004)
 V.B. Rose (2004–2009)
 Bloody Kiss (2004–2005)
 Full House Kiss (2004–2008)
 The Magic Touch (2004–2005)
 Meine Liebe (2004–2006)
 Sugar Princess (2005–2007)
 Fairy Cube (2005–2006)
 Karakuri Odette (2005–2007)
 Happy Cafe (2005–2009)
 NG Life (2005–2009)
 Venus Capriccio (2006–2008)
 Hana to Akuma (2007–2011)
 Twinkle Stars (2007–2011)
 Oresama Teacher (2007–2020)
 Kyō mo Ashita mo (2008–2012)
 Love So Life (2009–2015)
 Kamisama Kiss (2008–2016)
 Lovesick (2008–2009)
 Voice Over! Seiyu Academy (2009–2013)
 Jiu Jiu (2009–2010)
 Ōji to Majo to Himegimi to (2009)

2010–2021

 The World Is Still Beautiful (2012–2020)
 Usotoki Rhetoric (2012–2018)
 Anonymous Noise (2013–2019)
Cheeky Brat (2013–2021)
Takane and Hana (2014–2020)
Sacrificial Princess and the King of Beasts (2015–2020)
Life So Happy (2016–2018)
Nin Koi (2018–2020)

Related magazines
 Bessatsu Hana to Yume
 LaLa
 LaLa DX
 Melody
 The Hana to Yume
 Hanalala

Notes

References

External links
  
 Hana to Yumes editorial department blog 
 

Semimonthly manga magazines published in Japan
Magazines established in 1974
Shōjo manga magazines
Hakusensha magazines
1974 establishments in Japan
Magazines published in Tokyo